In late 2013, al-Shabaab carried out two major suicide attacks in Beledweyne, Somalia, killing 35 people.

Background
The Islamist group al-Shabaab began their insurgency in the 2000s. Previous actions by al-Shabaab in Beledweyne, Hiran, Hirshabelle State, included a suicide car bombing in 2009 which killed 57 people at a hotel as well as battles in 2010 and 2011.

October bombing
At 11am on 19 October 2013 in Beledweyne, a suicide bomber wearing an explosive belt detonated it inside a crowded restaurant, killing 16 people. On the same day, al-Shabaab claimed responsibility, saying their main target was Djiboutian and Ethiopian troops who were part of the African Union Mission to Somalia. Some AU soldiers were killed, but most of those killed were civilians.

November attack
At 11am on 19 November 2013 in Beledweyne, a suicide car bomber rammed a police station. Gunmen then stormed the building and shot people inside. At least 19 people were killed. On the same day, al-Shabaab claimed responsibility.

See also
2022 Beledweyne bombing

References

2013 murders in Somalia
2010s building bombings
2013 mass shootings in Africa
2010s vehicular rampage
21st-century mass murder in Somalia
Al-Shabaab (militant group) attacks
Attacks on buildings and structures in 2013

Attacks on police stations in the 2010s
Attacks on restaurants in Africa
2013 attacks
Building bombings in Somalia
Car and truck bombings in the 2010s
Islamic terrorist incidents in 2013
Mass murder in 2013
Mass shootings in Somalia
November 2013 crimes
November 2013 events in Africa
October 2013 crimes
October 2013 events in Africa
Somali Civil War (2009–present)
Suicide bombings in 2013
Suicide car and truck bombings in Somalia
Terrorist incidents in Somalia in 2013
Vehicular rampage in Africa
Attacks in Africa in 2013